In English, the digraph  represents in most cases one of two different phonemes: the voiced dental fricative  (as in this) and the voiceless dental fricative  (thing).

General description 
In standard English, the phonetic realization of the dental fricative phonemes shows less variation than for many other English consonants. Both are pronounced either interdentally, with the blade of the tongue resting against the lower part of the back of the upper teeth and the tip protruding slightly, or with the tip of the tongue against the back of the upper teeth. Lip configuration may vary depending on phonetic context. The vocal folds are abducted. The velopharyngeal port is closed. Air forced between tongue surface and cutting edge of the upper teeth (interdental) or inside surface of the teeth (dental) creates audible frictional turbulence.

However, the two phonemes are also distinguished by other phonetic markers. There is a difference of energy (see: Fortis and lenis), the fortis  being pronounced with more muscular tension than the lenis .

Assimilation 
As with many English consonants, a process of assimilation can result in the substitution of other speech sounds in certain phonetic environments. Native speakers do this subconsciously.

At word boundaries, alveolar stops next to dental fricatives assimilate very regularly, especially in rapid colloquial speech, involving both the place of articulation and the manner of articulation: the alveolar stops become dental, while the dental fricatives become stops. The resulting consonant is usually long (geminated) which may be the only audible cue for the speaker to distinguish particular words (for example, the definite and indefinite articles, compare "run the mile"  and "run a mile" ).
 in the:  → 
 join the army:  → 
 read these:  → 
 right there:  →  (more commonly: , with a glottal stop)
 fail the test:  → 

The alveolar fricatives may become dental as well:
 this thing:  →  or 
 takes them:  →  or 
 was this:  →   or 

 and  can also be lost through elision: months , clothes .
In rapid speech,  may be pronounced like six. Them may be contracted to 'em, and in this case the contraction is often indicated in writing. Some linguists see  'em as originally a separate word, a remnant of Old English hem, but as the apostrophe shows, it is perceived in modern English as a contraction of them.

Dialectal realizations 
Fronting and stopping are more common among native speakers of English dialects, whereas alveolarization is more common among language learners whose first languages are French, German, or Mandarin.

This is called debuccalization, and somewhat prevalent in Scottish English.

th-fronting 

Although traditionally stigmatized as typical of a Cockney accent, this pronunciation is fairly widespread, especially when immediately surrounded by other fricatives for ease of pronunciation, and has, in the early 20th century, become an increasingly noticeable feature of the Estuary English accent of South East England. It has in at least one case been transferred into standard English as a neologism: a bovver boy is a thug, a "boy" who likes "bother" (fights). Joe Brown and his Bruvvers was a Pop group of the 1960s. The song "Fings ain't wot they used t'be" was the title song of a 1959 Cockney comedy. Similarly, a New Zealander from the northernmost parts of the country might state that he or she is from "Norfland".

th-stopping 

Many speakers of African American Vernacular English, Caribbean English, Liberian English, Nigerian English, Philadelphia English, and Philippine English (along with other Asian English varieties) pronounce the fricatives  as alveolar stops . Similarly, but still distinctly, many speakers of New York City English, Chicago English, Boston English, Indian English, Newfoundland English, and Hiberno-English use the dental stops  (typically distinct from alveolar ) instead of, or in free variation with, .

This is also associated with the accent of the English city of Sheffield (such as the nickname dee-dahs for residents) but such pronunciations are now confined to the very oldest residents of Sheffield.

th-alveolarization 
It is an example of assibilation.

In rarer or older varieties of African American Vernacular English,  may be pronounced  after a vowel and before another consonant, as in bathroom .

Th-alveolarization is often parodied as typical of French- and German-speaking learners of English, but it is widespread among many other foreign learners because the dental fricative "th" sounds are not very common among the world's languages. Due to the said ridicule, learners who are unable to realize these sounds sometimes opt for the less marked th-fronting or th-stopping instead of alveolarization.

th-debuccalization 
In many varieties of Scottish English,  becomes  word initially and intervocalically.

Th-debuccalization occurs mainly in Glasgow and across the Central Belt. This feature is becoming more common in these places over time, but is still variable. In word final position,  is used, as in standard English.

The existing and particular lexical distribution of th-debuccalization imposes special constraints on the progress of th-fronting in Glasgow.

In accents with th-debuccalization, the cluster  becomes , giving these dialects a consonant cluster that does not occur in other dialects.

 three – 
 throw – 
 through, threw – 
 thrash – 
 thresh – 
 thrown, throne – 
 thread – 
 threat –

Acquisition problems 
Children generally learn the less marked phonemes of their native language before the more marked ones. Prior to this age, many children substitute the sounds  and  respectively. For small children, fought and thought are therefore homophones. As British and American children begin school at age four and five respectively, this means that many are learning to read and write before they have sorted out these sounds, and the infantile pronunciation is frequently reflected in their spelling errors: ve fing for the thing.

The lisp is a common speech impediment in English.

Foreign learners may have parallel problems. Learners from very many cultural backgrounds have difficulties with English dental fricatives, usually caused by interference with either sibilants or stops. Words with a dental fricative adjacent to an alveolar fricative, such as clothes , truths , fifths , sixths , anesthetic , etc., are commonly very difficult for foreign learners to pronounce.

Phonology and distribution 

In modern English,  and  bear a phonemic relationship to each other, as is demonstrated by the presence of a small number of minimal pairs: thigh:thy, ether:either, teeth:teethe. Thus they are distinct phonemes (units of sound, differences in which can affect meaning), as opposed to allophones (different pronunciations of a phoneme having no effect on meaning). They are distinguished from the neighbouring labiodental fricatives, sibilants and alveolar stops by such minimal pairs as thought:fought/sought/taught and then:Venn/Zen/den.

The vast majority of words in English with  have , and almost all newly created words do. However, the constant recurrence of the function words, particularly the, means that  is nevertheless more frequent in actual use.

The distribution pattern may be summed up in the following rule of thumb, which is valid in most cases: in an initial position,  is used except in certain function words; in a medial position,  is used except for certain foreign loan words; and in final position,  is used except in certain verbs. A more detailed explanation follows.

Initial position
Almost all words beginning with a dental fricative have .
The words in this group are:
1 definite article: the
4 demonstratives: this, that, these, those2 personal pronouns each with multiple forms: thou, thee, thy, thine, thyself; they, them, their, theirs, themselves, themself7 adverbs and conjunctions: there, then, than, thus, though, thence, thither (though in the United States thence and thither may be pronounced with initial )
Various compound adverbs based on the above words: therefore, thereupon, thereby, thereafter, thenceforth, etc.
Thomas): see below.

Medial position
Most native words with a medial  have .
Between vowels (including r-colored vowels), followed by a weak vowel: heathen, farthing, fathom, Worthington; and the frequent combination -ther-: bother, brother, dither, either, farther, father, further, heather, lather, mother, northern, other, rather, smithereens, slither, southern, together, weather, whether, wither; Caruthers, Netherlands, Witherspoon.
Followed by : brethren.
A few native words have a medial :
The suffixes -y, -ly, -ing and -ed normally leave terminal  unchanged: earthy, healthy, pithy, stealthy, wealthy, bothy (from booth); fourthly, monthly; earthing; frothed; but worthy and swarthy have .
Some plurals have , as discussed in more detail below.
Compound words in which the first element ends or the second element begins with  frequently have , as these elements would in isolation: bathroom, Southampton; anything, everything, nothing, something.
The only other native words with medial  would seem to be brothel (usually) and Ethel.
Most loan words with a medial  have .
From Greek: Agatha, anthem, atheist, Athens, athlete, cathedral, Catherine, Cathy, enthusiasm, ether, ethics, ethnic, lethal, lithium, mathematics, method, methyl, mythical, panther, pathetic, sympathyFrom Latin: author, authority (though in Latin these had ; see below). Also names borrowed from or via Latin: Bertha, Gothic, Hathaway, Othello, ParthianFrom Celtic languages: Arthur (Welsh has  medially); Abernathy, Abernethy, as an anglicization, though Gaelic has no . 
From Hebrew: Ethan, Jonathan, Bethlehem, Bethany, Leviathan, BethelFrom German: Luther, as an anglicized spelling pronunciation (see below).
Loanwords with medial :
Greek words with the combination -thm-: algorithm, logarithm, rhythm. Exception : arithmetic .

Final position

Nouns and adjectives
Nouns and adjectives ending in a dental fricative usually have : bath, breath, cloth, froth, health, hearth, loath, mouth, sheath, sooth, tooth/teeth, width, wreath.
Verbs
Verbs ending in a dental fricative usually have , and are frequently spelled with a silent : bathe, breathe, clothe, loathe, scathe, scythe, seethe, sheathe, soothe, teethe, tithe, wreathe, writhe. Spelled without : mouth (verb) nevertheless has .froth has  whether as a noun or as a verb.
Likewise clothing used as a noun, scathing as an adjective etc.
The archaic verb inflection "-eth" has .

Plurals
Plural  after  may be realized as either  or :
Others have only /θs/: azimuths, breaths, cloths, deaths, faiths, Goths, growths, mammoths, moths, myths, smiths, sloths, zeniths, etc. This includes all words in 'th' preceded by a consonant (earths, hearths, lengths, months, widths, etc.) and all numeric words, whether preceded by vowel or consonant (fourths, fifths, sixths, sevenths, eighths , twelfths, fifteenths, twentieths, hundredths , thousandths).Booth has  in the singular and hence  in the plural for most speakers in England. This pronunciation also prevails in Scotland.

Grammatical alternation
Typically  appears in the singular of a noun,  in the plural and in the related verb: cloth , clothes , to clothe . The loss of inflections then brought the voiced medial consonant to the end of the word. Often a remnant of the old inflection can be seen in the spelling in the form of a silent , which may be thought of synchronically as a marker of the voicing.

Regional differences in distribution

The above discussion follows Daniel Jones' English Pronouncing Dictionary, an authority on standard British English, and Webster's New World College Dictionary, an authority on American English. Usage appears much the same between the two. Regional variation within standard English includes the following:
The final consonant in with is pronounced  (its original pronunciation) in northern Britain, but  in the south, though some speakers of Southern British English use  before a voiceless consonant and  before a voiced one. A 1993 postal poll of American English speakers showed that 84% use , while 16% have  (Shitara 1993).
In Scottish English,  is found in many words which have  further south. The phenomenon of nouns terminating in  taking plurals in  does not occur in the north. Thus the following have : baths, mouths (noun), truths. Scottish English does have the termination  in verb forms, however, such as bathes, mouths (verb), loathes, and also in the noun clothes, which can be realized without . Where there is an American-British difference, the North of Britain generally agrees with the United States on this phoneme pair.
Some dialects of American English use  at the beginning of the word "thank".

History of the English phonemes

Germanic origins
Proto-Indo-European (PIE) had no dental fricatives, but these evolved in the earliest stages of the Germanic languages.
 *đ was derived by Grimm's law from PIE *dʰ or by Verner's law (i.e. when immediately following an unstressed syllable) from PIE *t.
 *þ was derived by Grimm's law from PIE *t.
In West Germanic, the Proto-Germanic *đ shifted further to *d, leaving only one dental fricative phoneme. This West Germanic phoneme, complete with its distribution of allophones, survived into Old English.

The whole complex of Germanic dentals, and the place of the fricatives within it, can be summed up in this table:

Note that this table shows only the basic rules. The actual developments in all of the mentioned languages are more complicated (due to dialectal variation, peculiar developments in consonant clusters, etc.). For more on these phonemes from a comparative perspective, see Grammatischer Wechsel. For the developments in German and Dutch see High German consonant shift.

Old English

Thus English inherited a phoneme  in positions where other West Germanic languages have  and most other Indo-European languages have : English three, German drei, Latin tres.

In Old English, the phoneme , like all fricative phonemes in the language, had two allophones, one voiced and one voiceless, which were distributed regularly according to phonetic environment.
 (like  and ) was used between two voiced sounds (either vowels or voiced consonants).
 (like  and ) was spoken in initial and final position, and also medially if adjacent to another unvoiced consonant.

Development up to Modern English
Minimal pairs, and hence the phonological independence of the two phones, developed as a result of three main processes.

Possibly this was a sandhi development; as these words are frequently found in unstressed positions, they can sometimes appear to run on from the preceding word, which may have resulted in the dental fricative being treated as though it were word-internal. This allowed a word-initial minimal pair like thigh:thy. 
English has borrowed many words from Greek, including a vast number of scientific terms. This allowed a medial minimal pair like ether:either.
English has lost its original verb inflections. When the stem of a verb ends with a dental fricative, this was usually followed by a vowel in Old English, and was therefore voiced. Examples are to bathe, to mouth, to breathe. Sometimes a remnant of the original vowel remained in the spelling (see: Silent e), but this was inconsistent. This allowed a minimal pair in final position like loath:loathe.

Other changes that affected these phonemes included a shift  →  when followed by unstressed suffix -er. Thus Old English fæder became modern English father; likewise mother, gather, hither, together, weather (from mōdor, gaderian, hider, tōgædere, weder). In a reverse process, Old English byrþen and morþor or myþra become burden and murder (compare the obsolete variants burthen and murther).

On the other hand, some dialects retain original d, and extend it to other words, as brother, further, rather. The Welsh name Llewelyn appears in older English texts as Thlewelyn (Rolls of Parliament (Rotuli parliamentorum) I. 463/1, King Edward I or II), and Fluellen (Shakespeare, Henry V). Th also occurs dialectally for wh, as in thirl, thortleberry, thorl, for whirl, whortleberry, whorl.

The old verb inflection -eth (Old English -eþ) was replaced by -s (he singeth → he sings), not a sound shift but a completely new inflection, the origin of which is still being debated. Possibilities include alveolarization (since s is easier to pronounce there than th), or displacement by a nonstandard English dialect.

History of the digraph

for /θ/ and /ð/
Though English speakers take it for granted, the digraph  is in fact not an obvious combination for a dental fricative. The origins of this have to do with developments in Greek.

Since  sounds like  with a following puff of air,  was the logical spelling in the Latin alphabet.

By the time of New Testament Greek (koiné), however, the aspirated stop had shifted to a fricative: . Thus theta came to have the sound that it still has in Modern Greek, and which it represents in the IPA. From a Latin perspective, the established digraph  now represented the voiceless fricative , and was used thus for English by French-speaking scribes after the Norman Conquest, since they were unfamiliar with the Germanic graphemes ð (eth) and þ (thorn). It also appeared in early modern Swedish before a final shift to /d/.

for /t/

Since neither  nor  was a native sound in Latin, the tendency must have emerged early, and at the latest by medieval Latin, to substitute . Thus, in many modern languages, including French and German, the  digraph is used in Greek loan-words to represent an original , but is now pronounced : examples are French théâtre, German Theater. In some cases, this etymological , which has no remaining significance for pronunciation, has been transferred to words in which there is no etymological justification for it. For example, German Tal ('valley', cognate with English dale) appears in many place-names with an archaic spelling Thal (contrast Neandertal and Neanderthal). The German spelling reform of 1901 largely reversed these, but they remain in some proper nouns.

Examples of this are also to be found in English, perhaps influenced immediately by French. In Modern English we see it in Esther, Thomas, Thames, thyme, Witham (the town in Essex, not the river in Lincolnshire which is pronounced with ) and the old spelling of Satan as Sathan. More recently, the name of the capital of Nepal was often written Katmandu down to the late 20th century, but is now usually spelt Kathmandu.

for /th/

A few English compound words, such as lightheaded or hothouse, have the letter combination  split between the parts, though this is not a digraph. Other examples are anthill, goatherd, lighthouse, outhouse, pothead; also in words formed with the suffix -hood: knighthood, and the similarly formed Afrikaans loanword apartheid. In a few place names ending in t+ham, the t-h boundary has been lost and become a spelling pronunciation, for example Grantham.

See also
Pronunciation
English pronunciation
Received Pronunciation
Spelling pronunciation
Non-native pronunciations of English
English orthography
Thorn
Eth

References

Citations

Sources 

 
 Shitara, Yuko (1993). "A survey of American pronunciation preferences." Speech Hearing and Language 7: 201–32.
 
 

English phonology
English th